Cyril Obiozor  (born September 26, 1986) is a former American football linebacker. He was signed by the Green Bay Packers as an undrafted free agent in 2009. He played college football at Texas A&M.

He also played for the Arizona Cardinals and San Diego Chargers.

Professional career

Green Bay Packers
Obiozor signed with the Packers as an undrafted free agent in May 2009. He remained on the team's practice squad throughout the first 13 weeks of the 2009 regular season. After the team placed Aaron Kampman on injured reserve, Obiozor was moved to the active roster for the last five games. He made 2 total tackles in those five games.

Arizona Cardinals
On September 5, 2010, Obiozor was claimed off waivers by the Arizona Cardinals. He was waived on September 21 but re-signed to the practice squad two days later.

San Diego Chargers
On October 5, Obiozor was signed to the Chargers roster after Jyles Tucker went on injured reserve.

Arizona Cardinals (second stint)
He was released on September 2, 2011.

References

External links
 Green Bay Packers bio 

1986 births
Living people
People from Pearland, Texas
Players of American football from Texas
American football linebackers
American people of Igbo descent
Igbo sportspeople
American sportspeople of Nigerian descent
Texas A&M Aggies football players
Green Bay Packers players
Arizona Cardinals players
San Diego Chargers players
Sportspeople from Harris County, Texas
Pearland High School alumni